Cigarette Rock is a summit in Lewis and Clark County, Montana, in the United States.

References

Mountains of Lewis and Clark County, Montana
Mountains of Montana